Brian Jackson (28 December 1932 – 3 July 1983) was a 20th-century British educationalist who was involved in the debate over selective schooling during the 1960s.

In 1960 Brian Jackson and Michael Young created the Advisory Centre for Education. They went on to establish the National Extension College in 1963 as a pilot for the Open University. He founded the National Educational Research and Development Trust (NERDT) which set up the National Children's Centre in 1975 in Huddersfield. Jackson had a major influence on the development of ideas in the field of childcare, and their practical application.

Brian Jackson collapsed 500 yards from the finish whilst taking part in a charity five mile run in aid of the National Children's Centre. He was given heart massage but was pronounced dead on arrival at Huddersfield Royal Infirmary.

Bibliography
 Education and the Working Class [with Dennis Marsden] (1962)

References 

20th-century British people
1932 births
1983 deaths
Alumni of Downing College, Cambridge